Packiam is a surname. Notable people with the surname include:

 Glenn Packiam (born 1978), Malaysian-American musician and pastor
 Julius Packiam, Indian film score composer

See also
 Packham